Normal Lyceum of Helsinki (In Finnish; Helsingin normaalilyseo) is a school in Helsinki, Finland, consisting of the upper part of primary school (peruskoulun yläaste, grades 7 to 9) and secondary school (lukio).

Unlike most other schools in Helsinki, the school is not owned by the city of Helsinki, but is instead part of the University of Helsinki, which itself is owned directly by the state of Finland. The school is considered one of the most prestigious. It is the second hardest to get into, in the entire country, tied with Ressun Lukio. The most difficult one is Helsingin yliopiston Viikin normaalikoulu, which is also owned by the University of Helsinki.

The established nickname for the school is Norssi, which also means a student of the school. Former students who have graduated from the school are called vanha Norssi (Finnish for "old Norssi"). The school has a constant, good-natured rivalry with Ressun lukio (Ressu Upper Secondary School, previously known as "Helsingin reaalilyseo") and Helsingin Suomalainen Yhteiskoulu which are considered even more prestigious than the Normal Lyceum by some.

History
The Helsinki normal lyceum was initially conceived in the autumn of 1867, when Finnish-speaking classes were added to the Swedish normal lyceum of Helsinki. Because of linguistic political reasons, the Finnish classes were ordered to be discontinued in 1871, but the Finnish schooling continued directly in a privately owned Helsinki Finnish Primary School. In the autumn of 1878, the Primary School moved to a newly built school building at Ratakatu 2 in Punavuori, Helsinki.

In 1887, the Primary School became state-owned and was named the Helsinki Finnish Normal Lyceum. The school went through several name changes until finally becoming the Helsinki Normal Lyceum on January 1, 1995.

The school operated at Ratakatu 2 from 1887 to 1905 until it moved to a new building at Ratakatu 4 (nowadays Ratakatu 6). In the spring of 2006 teaching started again in the old school building at Ratakatu 6a, which has been completely renovated and modernized. At the same time a phased renovation of the school building at Ratakatu 6b started. Currently the teaching takes place at Ratakatu 6a and in some parts of Ratakatu 6b.

Notable alumni

 Matti Klinge, professor of history
 J.K. Paasikivi, politician and diplomat
 Lasse Pöysti, actor and playwright
 Pentti Saarikoski, poet
 Erkki Salmenhaara, professor or musicology and composer
 Toivo J. Särkkä, film director and producer
 Mika Waltari, author

Trivia
Right next to the school is a gas station, which was used as the scenery for the fictional café "Wanha Bensis" in the Finnish drama series Kotikatu.

External links
 Official home page

Schools in Helsinki
Secondary schools in Finland
Ullanlinna